Parliamentary elections were held in Seychelles between 10 and 12 May 2007. The result was a landslide victory for the ruling Seychelles People's Progressive Front, which retained all 23 of its seats in the 34-seat National Assembly.

Results

References

Elections in Seychelles
Seychelles 
2007 in Seychelles